George Henry Simmons Garton (born 15 April 1997) is an English international cricketer who plays for the England national cricket team and Sussex County Cricket Club. He is a left-handed Batsman who bowls left-arm fast. He made his international debut for England in January 2022.

Domestic career
Garton made his first-class debut for Sussex against the Leeds/Bradford MCC University side in April 2016. Prior to his first-class debut, Garton was named in England's U19 squad for the 2016 Under-19 Cricket World Cup.

In August 2020, in the third round of matches in the 2020 Bob Willis Trophy, Garton took his maiden five-wicket haul in first-class cricket. In 2021, he was drafted by Southern Brave for the inaugural season of The Hundred. He was the second highest wicket taker for Southern Brave with 10 wickets in 9 matches.

On 25 August 2021, Garton was included in the Royal Challengers Bangalore squad for the second phase of the 2021 Indian Premier League (IPL) in the UAE. He made his IPL debut on 29 September 2021 against Rajasthan Royals. In April 2022, he was bought by the Southern Brave for the 2022 season of The Hundred.

In September 2022 Garton was bought by the Joburg Super Kings for the inaugural season in the SA20 league in 2023.

International career
In November 2017, Garton was added to England's Test squad for the 2017–18 Ashes series as cover for Jake Ball.

In June 2021, Garton was named in England's One Day International (ODI) squad for their series against Sri Lanka.

In December 2021, Garton was named in England's Twenty20 International (T20I) squad for their series against the West Indies. He made his T20I debut on 26 January 2022, for England against the West Indies.

Education 
Garton did his schooling at Hurstpierpoint College. Later, he studied economics and business at Loughborough.

References

External links
 

1997 births
Living people
English cricketers
England Twenty20 International cricketers
Sportspeople from Brighton
Sussex cricketers
Southern Brave cricketers
Adelaide Strikers cricketers